Henry Jones Thaddeus (1859 – 1929) was a realist and portrait painter born and trained in County Cork, Ireland.

Life and career
Born Henry Thaddeus Jones in 1859, he entered the Cork School of Art when he was ten years old. There he studied under the genre painter James Brenan. Thaddeus won the Taylor Prize in 1878 enabling him to go to London, and then again in 1879 enabling him to continue his studies in Paris at the Académie Julian. His first major painting (illustration, right) was hung "on the line" (at eye-level) at the Paris Salon of 1881.

He received commissions to paint portraits, among them two papal portrait commissions (for Pope Pius X), and became a Fellow of the Royal Geographical Society. He received several other portrait commissions.

In his latter years he settled in the Isle of Wight, and died there at Ryde, on 1 May 1929.

His autobiography was titled Recollections of a Court Painter, which he wrote during his retirement in California.

Renewed interest 
Art historian Julian Campbell became interested in Jones, and other mid-to-late-century Irish artists, and assembled the Irish Impressionists exhibition in 1984 at the National Gallery of Ireland. However, many of the artists exhibited, like Thaddeus, were not strictly Impressionists.

See also

 List of Orientalist artists
 Orientalism

Further reading
Brendan Rooney, 2003. Henry Jones Thaddeus (Peter Murray)

References

1859 births
1929 deaths
19th-century Irish painters
20th-century Irish painters
Irish male painters
Irish genre painters
Realist painters
Irish portrait painters
Orientalist painters
People from County Cork
Fellows of the Royal Geographical Society
19th-century Irish male artists
20th-century Irish male artists